The planar hydroid (Sertularella arbuscula) is a branching colonial hydroid in the family Sertulariidae.

Description

Planar hydroids are bright yellow and branched in one plane with a zig-zag appearance to the stems. The colonies usually grow up to 30 cm in height.

Distribution
This colonial animal is found off the southern African coast from Saldanha Bay to central Mozambique, as well as off Vema Seamount, through the Indian Ocean and off Australia,  down to 219m under water.

Ecology
Planar hydroids live on vertical subtidal rock faces perpendicular to normal water flow. They feed on plankton.

References

Sertularellidae
Animals described in 1816